Tómas Lemarquis  (born 3 August 1977) is an Icelandic–French actor.

Early life
Lemarquis was born in Reykjavík, the son of an Icelandic mother and a French father, Gérard Lemarquis, who is a schoolteacher. His most distinguishing physical feature—a complete lack of hair of any kind—is the result of alopecia universalis, which made him completely hairless by the age of 14. He grew up in Iceland, and studied theater at the Cours Florent in Paris, where he was a classmate of actress Audrey Tautou. He also attended the Reykjavík School of Fine Arts in Iceland, graduating in 2004.

Career
Lemarquis is possibly best known for his starring role in the 2003 Icelandic film Nói Albínói (e. Noi the Albino). Lemarquis' played a lead role in the 2018 Berlinale Film Festival winner, Touch Me Not. He has also appeared in films such as Snowpiercer, X-Men: Apocalypse and Blade Runner 2049.

Personal life
Lemarquis resides in Paris. He is fluent in Icelandic, French, Danish, German and English.

Filmography

References

External links

Tómas Lemarquis.com

1977 births
Living people
Icelandic male film actors
Icelandic people of French descent
Icelandic expatriates in France
Male actors from Reykjavík
21st-century Icelandic male actors
People with alopecia universalis
French people of Icelandic descent